The High Commissioner for the Western Pacific was the chief executive officer of the British Western Pacific Territories, a British colonial entity, which existed from 1877 until 1976. Numerous colonial possessions were attached to the Territories at different times, the most durable constituent colonies being Fiji (1877 — 1952) and the Solomon Islands (1893 — 1976).

The office of High Commissioner never existed independently, but was always filled ex officio by the Governor of one of the constitutive British islands colonies. The High Commissioners were concurrently Governor of Fiji from 1877 to the end of 1952, although the office was suspended from 1942 through 1945, with most of the islands under British military rule and others, namely the Solomon Islands, Gilbert Islands and Phoenix Islands, under Japanese occupation. From 1 January 1953 to 1976, when the office was abolished, the Governor of the Solomon Islands doubled as High Commissioner. On 1 January 1972, the Gilbert and Ellice Islands were taken off with their own governor. On 2 January 1976 after nearly all had been given separate statehood, the office of High Commissioner and the entity of the Pacific Territories were abolished.

They administered from Suva and Honiara, respectively.

List of High Commissioners for the Western Pacific (1877–1976)

References

Sources and external links
 WorldStatesmen
 Deryck Scarr, Fragments of Empire. A History of the Western Pacific High Commission. 1877-1914, Canberra: Australian National University Press & London: C. Hurst & Co., 1967.
 McIntyre, William David. "Disraeli's colonial policy: The creation of the Western Pacific High Commission, 1874–1877." Historical Studies: Australia and New Zealand Volume 9, Issue 35  (1960): 279-294.

Lists of office-holders
History of Oceania
Oceania-related lists
Solomon Islands diplomacy-related lists
Western Pacific
Governance of the British Empire
 
Fiji diplomacy-related lists